Graham Stiles Newell (November 27, 1915 – June 20, 2008) was a Republican member of the Vermont State Senate, who represented Caledonia County in the Vermont Senate. He had also been elected to the Vermont House, and was an educator.

Early life

Newell was born in St. Johnsbury, Vermont on November 27, 1915. After graduating St. Johnsbury Academy in 1933, he went on to study at Middlebury College and the University of Chicago where he earned a Bachelor of Arts degree in 1938.  He received a Master of Arts degree in Latin in 1949 from Chicago, and did further postgraduate studies in medieval Latin.

Public life
Newell was first elected to the Vermont House of Representatives in 1952 where he served four non-consecutive terms. He was elected to the Vermont Senate for a total of eight consecutive terms  In 1980, he retired from public life.

Governor Deane Davis appointed him to the Little Hoover Commission which reorganized the state government into agencies that largely still existed  in 2008.

President John F. Kennedy appointed him to the National Advisory Commission on Intergovernmental Relations.

He was a founding member of the Vermont American Civil Liberties Union. He opposed the busing of Vermont parochial school children during his legislative years.

Career
He taught Latin and other humanities classes at St. Johnsbury Academy from 1938 to 1947. He taught at the Hatch Preparatory School, Dexter, Maine from 1947-8. He taught at St. Johnsbury Junior High School 1957-8.

In 1959 he was appointed  chairman of the social science department at Lyndon State College, a position he held until he retired as professor emeritus in 1979. He continued to teach there part-time until 1996. In 2011, there was a Graham Newell Chair in History at the college.

He served on the New England Board of Higher Education from 1959 to 1965.

He resumed teaching Latin at St. Johnsbury Academy in 1982 until his death. He was preparing for his next classes until three days before he died.

Other positions
Elected delegate to Republican National Convention 1956 and 1964
President, Vermont Historical Society

Awards
Vermont Chamber of Commerce Citizens of the Year 2005
 Victor R. Swenson Humanities Educator Award 2003, the first awarded, from the Vermont Humanities Council
Inducted into Vermont Academy or Arts and Sciences, 2005
Honorary Doctor of Humane Letters, University of Vermont 2006

Commemorative Measures
Newell's life has been commemorated in the following ways:

 Newell's likeness was painted in a Mural on the back wall of The Star Theatre in St. Johnsbury.
St. Johnsbury Academy honors Newell's commitment to learning with the Graham Newell Education Grant.
 Newell Hall at St. Johnsbury Academy is named in Newell's honor.

References

External links
Vermont Encyclopedia retrieved July 5, 2008
VFC Radio retrieved July 5, 2008
Obituary - Caledonian Record retrieved May 31, 2010

Vermont state senators
Members of the Vermont House of Representatives
People from St. Johnsbury, Vermont
1915 births
2008 deaths
University of Chicago alumni
St. Johnsbury Academy alumni
20th-century American politicians